Dovga is a national meal of Azerbaijani cuisine, a soup traditionally made from plain yoghurt and herbs. 

More often now, it is a vegetarian, yoghurt-based soup cooked with a variety of herbs. Coriander, dill, mint and rice are mainstays of the soup. Chervil and mountain parsley can be added. Spring onions or sorrel can also be used for more tender flavours. Sometimes it's cooked with chickpeas.  It is often served warm in winter or refreshingly cool in summer. Traditionally served as an Azerbaijani wedding soup, served between courses of meat.

Ingredients
Makes 4 portions
 1 liter of yogurt
 1 tablespoon of flour
 2 tablespoons of rice
 1 egg
 a bunch of spinach
 a bunch of dill
 a bunch of coriander
 a bunch of mint

See also
Azerbaijani cuisine
Ash-e doogh, a similar Iranian soup
Toyga soup, a similar Turkish soup
 List of soups
 List of yogurt-based dishes and beverages

References

External links
 

Azerbaijani soups
Azerbaijani inventions
Azerbaijani words and phrases
Yogurt-based dishes